Bandar Al-Nakhli  is a Saudi Arabian footballer who played for the Saudi Arabia national football team in the 1984 Asian Cup.

References
Stats

Living people
Saudi Arabian footballers
Saudi Arabia international footballers
1984 AFC Asian Cup players
AFC Asian Cup-winning players
Association football midfielders
Year of birth missing (living people)
Saudi Professional League players
Ohod Club players
Al-Ahli Saudi FC players
Saudi Arabian Shia Muslims